The A 25 road is an A-Grade trunk road in Sri Lanka. It connects the Siyabalanduwa with Ampara.

The A 25 passes through Pallewela, Wadinagala, and Damana to reach Ampara.

References

Highways in Sri Lanka
Transport in Eastern Province, Sri Lanka